Dave Thomson (2 February 1938 – 28 January 2016) was a Scottish professional footballer.

Thomson was part of the Dunfermline Athletic team that won the 1960–61 Scottish Cup, scoring the opening goal with a header in the 67th minute.

Thomson died on 28 January 2016 at the age of 77.

References

External links

1938 births
2016 deaths
Scottish footballers
Association football forwards
Scottish Football League players
English Football League players
Bo'ness United F.C. players
Dunfermline Athletic F.C. players
Leicester City F.C. players
Queen of the South F.C. players
Linlithgow Rose F.C. players
East Stirlingshire F.C. players
Berwick Rangers F.C. players
People from Stenhousemuir